Ray Mia is a British film, audio and theatre producer.

Born in Seaforth, Merseyside, he was educated at Balliol College, Oxford, University of Kent, and City College of New York.

In 2014, he joined Universal Music group as Executive Vice President, where he specialised in immersive audio technologies, working with artists including The Beatles, Justin Bieber, Shawn Mendes and Ennio Morricone.

In 2018, he launched the Liverpool-based record label Jacaranda Records to help support grass roots music in the city.

In 2022, he produced The Marlowe Sessions, a season of productions featuring the complete attributed works of the Elizabethan playwright Christopher Marlowe. Performed live by an ensemble cast including Dominic West, Talulah Riley, Michael Maloney and Alan Cox, the "script in hand" performances were captured and recorded in immersive audio.

References

Living people
British film producers
British record producers
British theatre managers and producers
British company founders
People from Seaforth, Merseyside
Year of birth missing (living people)
Alumni of Balliol College, Oxford
Alumni of the University of Kent
City College of New York alumni